Nicole Rebecca Seah Xue Ling (born 17 October 1986) is a Singaporean politician. A member of the opposition Workers' Party (WP), she contested in the 2020 general election but lost by a close margin to the governing People's Action Party (PAP).

Seah rose to prominence as a candidate representing the National Solidarity Party (NSP) in Marine Parade GRC in the 2011 general election. At the age of 24, she was the youngest female candidate standing in the election, and immediately became a target of media attention, which became increasingly pronounced as her speeches began to go viral on YouTube. During the election, her number of social media followers rendered her being described as the second most popular Singaporean politician online after Lee Kuan Yew. 

On 29 August 2014, Seah resigned from the NSP, "to move on and grow in other areas." In 2020, Seah became a candidate of the Workers' Party (WP) contesting in East Coast GRC in the 2020 general election, and lost by a close margin of 6.78% to the People's Action Party (PAP) team led by Heng Swee Keat.

Early life and education
Seah was born in Singapore on 17 October 1986 in a Peranakan family. 

She attended CHIJ Katong Convent, Tanjong Katong Secondary School and Victoria Junior College before graduating from the National University of Singapore with a Bachelor of Social Sciences with honours degree. She was also part of the University Scholars' Programme.

She used to stay in a five-room HDB flat with her parents and two brothers, when she was introduced as the youngest candidate in the 2011 general election.

Career

Advertising career 
Seah previously worked as an executive at Starcom MediaVest Group, a brand communications company.

Seah worked as a senior account manager with IPG Mediabrands. In 2014, Seah moved to Bangkok, Thailand, to work as a digital manager at the company's Thailand office.

In 2020, Seah was an associate director at a multinational marketing company.

Political career

Seah has been involved in community activities and volunteering since secondary school. Her interest in politics was sparked by a meeting with a destitute woman, who – despite having a roof over her head – had no money for food, and was completely dependent on handouts from charity. While in NUS, she was the managing editor of an online publication called the Campus Observer.

National Solidarity Party 
Before the 2011 general election, Seah was involved with the Reform Party since 2009, but left in early February 2011 along with many other party members. She was invited to join the NSP by Goh Meng Seng, then the NSP's secretary-general.

Seah was announced as a member of the five-person NSP team contesting in the Marine Parade GRC in the 2011 Singaporean general election on 21 April 2011. This was the first time an opposition party had contested this GRC since 1992. This was several weeks after the PAP announced that their five-person team contesting Marine Parade GRC would include 27-year-old Tin Pei Ling, leading to immediate media attention to the contest of two young women, both contesting parliament seats for the first time. Tin had been facing online criticism since her candidature was announced, and – partially in response to Tin's positioning – Seah's popularity has grown tremendously, according to Jon Russell of Asia Sentinel, who added that "her popularity [is] testament to many choosing her as their preferred 'youth' candidate in the election". Her popularity has been referred to as "rockstar"-like by The Straits Times.

Yahoo! News commented that Seah appeared to upstage other members of the NSP and of her constituency team. On 27 April, Goh Chok Tong, former prime minister and Seah's opponent from the People's Action Party (PAP) team, complained that "I look at NSP and they appear to have only one person in charge and the four men are leaving it to the young lady to campaign and say all the things". The party was also referred to as the "Nicole Seah Party". Seah responded, "The NSP is all about teamwork. There are many different areas that everyone can contribute and that's how we synergise and bring our talents together to the table."

Seah's team captured 43.35% of the vote and did not manage to wrest Marine Parade GRC from the PAP in the 2011 election. Nevertheless, this was seen as a huge achievement as the incumbent PAP had won 72.9% of the vote in the last election, which was the 1992 by-election.  Also, the PAP team was helmed by a popular former Prime Minister, Goh Chok Tong.  Indeed, the PAP's winning percentage was lower than the national PAP average.  Goh later gave his thoughts on the election result in an interview with the Straits Times in which he stated that he had expected better results and cited Seah as a factor for the NSP's good showing.

During the election, Seah lodged a police report against PAP candidate Tin Pei Ling for breach of the state-mandated cooling-off period 24 hours before polls. It was subsequently revealed that she had also allegedly committed the same offence. The police issued a stern warning to Tin and Seah for the offence. Under the Singapore Parliamentary Elections Act, canvassing on Polling Day and Cooling Off Day is prohibited and the offence carries a fine or imprisonment or both.

After the election, Seah made an online appeal for donations for her campaign on her Facebook account, sparking off a debate on whether it is appropriate. On 23 May 2011, the NSP issued a public clarification statement and supported her actions.

Endorsement of presidential candidate 
On 30 July 2011, Seah endorsed presidential candidate Tan Jee Say, saying that "We need a President who is intellectual, who is a brilliant thinker, and not only that, someone who has a heart for the people and who can represent Singapore on the greater world stage."

She had appeared as a guest speaker at Tan's presidential rally on 23 August 2011 and also as a counting agent during the campaign.

On 28 August 2011, the Presidential election ended with Tan coming in third in the four-corner race, garnering 25.04 per cent or 529,732 votes out of a 2.1 million cast. Dr Tony Tan was elected with a slight margin of 7,269 votes. His closest contender was Dr Tan Cheng Bock.

"Tan Jee Say came in a very close second to Dr Tony Tan, so all of us had higher hopes that he might have perhaps pushed through. But nevertheless, I still feel that he put up a very good fight. All of us are very proud of him and I'm sure a lot of Singaporeans are also proud of him for having stood by his political ideologies. I wouldn't say he really lost outright, but the numbers varied. It was quite an even split; it was just unfortunate that he had a smaller share of it," said Ms Seah.

On 23 November 2013, Seah wrote a lengthy status on her personal Facebook page recounting her experience in the time since the 2011 general election, where she says she was "derailed" from her larger purpose, taking on opportunities with being elected in 2016 in mind, that she had suffered a meltdown over a series of events that unfolded this year in her life.

"Needless to say, when you start thinking about your life in 5 year blocks, you start to get equally myopic about the way you do things," she wrote, adding she was getting exhausted by her daily routine of work, house visits and walkabouts. She referred to a "terrible, irreversible mistake" she made during the presidential election two years ago as well, but did not mention it in specifics, only saying she "completely underestimated what her lobbying could do". She had thrown her weight behind presidential candidate Tan Jee Say during that time, speaking at his rallies and going on walkabouts with him.

Seah said she "felt like a fraud" being invited to speak at conferences when she was not an expert on "everything or anything", becoming self-conscious about her need to look and appear a certain way "so people wouldn't walk away feeling they've been cheated". "I was only cheating myself," she wrote, revealing also that she was constantly being stalked with threats of rape and death, and how she was played out dating 2-3 men who were “obviously more interested” in her public profile than who she really was as a person, and the combination of all these things triggered the start of her meltdown.

Seah shared that she was very stressed and unable to live up to what was expected of her at the digital sales agency she worked at, and suffered a physical panic attack at work in February that year when she learned her grandmother was diagnosed with third-stage stomach cancer. She then went on two months of medical leave, left her job, and contracted dengue fever. She subsequently took on another job working with companies in India, but said it "didn't work out as well", getting fired without the one-month compensation she was supposed to be entitled to in her contract. Her health then declined further, when she was hospitalised for slightly more than half a month, and wrote that she "practically subsisted on crackers and water because she was too weak to eat anything else".

In her next Facebook post however, Seah added that she was also grateful for her experiences, which had taught her several life lessons. She said she would be selling 90 per cent of her clothes to earn a bit of money, and stick to just 10 outfits for work. "The only way now is to go up," she concluded.

Resignation from National Solidarity Party 
On 29 August 2014, Seah resigned from the National Solidarity Party in an email statement sent to the media. Seah, who was based in Bangkok back then, said the decision was extremely difficult and painful. She said: “There was nothing which might have happened to trigger this departure. I started in politics as a fresh graduate wanting to make a difference, by bringing more political awareness and interest to young people ... It’s reached a point where I feel that my job is done (for now) and I have to move on and grow in other areas.” She wished the National Solidarity Party all the best, stating that: “For myself, this is not a complete departure from politics ... I will just need to find a more suitable platform to contribute and give back.”

On 2 August 2015, Seah stated that she would not be rejoining the National Solidarity Party and would not stand for the election, adding that she had been in touch with the party's assistant secretary-general Reno Fong and organising secretary Spencer Ng on Facebook. She was based in Bangkok at that point of time.

Workers' Party 
A few days later on 24 August 2015, Seah's Facebook post linking an article on He Ting Ru, who had contested as a Workers' Party candidate, has sparked speculation over her political allegiance. In one reply, she said: "I will definitely come back to help! Just not as a candidate." She had since began volunteering with the Party's media team after the 2015 general election.
On 23 June 2020, the Workers' Party featured Seah in a teaser video titled "GE2020: Coming Soon". She was later unveiled as a candidate by the party on 25 June 2020, and was announced to be contesting in a five-member Worker's Party team for the East Coast Group Representation Constituency in the 2020 Singaporean general election, where they faced off against Deputy Prime Minister and former Tampines Group Representation Constituency MP Heng Swee Keat. The battle was reportedly close, but they were defeated in a 53.41% to 46.59% vote, the highest result attained for the losing candidates for their party, and the second best-performing score among losing candidates, only behind Progress Singapore Party's West Coast GRC's score of 48.31%.

Personal life
On 27 November 2013, news site AsiaOne and newspaper Lianhe Wanbao issued an apology to Seah after they had inaccurately suggested that Seah was dating a married man. The man in question is Steven Goh, founder of social site mig33, who was already a divorcee. Seah noted via Facebook that she had threatened to sue. As her boyfriend distanced himself from her as he was concerned about his reputation back then, Seah and Goh have since split up. "Instead of supporting me through the ordeal, he left me to deal with the aftermath alone... Though I would have struggled silently in the past, this time I refused. I ended the eight-month relationship and I'm now single and happier than before." She revealed in an interview with Her World.

Seah married Bryan, a Singaporean engineer based in Australia, in a ceremony at the Registry of Marriages in August 2015. Seah gave birth to a daughter in 2018, with another daughter in 2022.

Seah had a small role in a 2015 SG50 film 1965 as Mei, the wife of a police inspector played by Qi Yuwu. The cameo role was offered by the director Randy Ang.

Filmography

References

External links

National University of Singapore alumni
Victoria Junior College alumni
Peranakan people in Singapore
Singaporean people of Teochew descent
1986 births
Living people
Singaporean women in politics
Workers' Party (Singapore) politicians